Akhil Bharatiya Kshatriya Mahasabha also known as All India Kshatriya Mahasabha was founded in the year 1897
It was formed to promote, protect and fight for rights and interests of Kshatriya community of the Indian society.

Early years
After Revolt of 1857 position of many Taluqdars and Rajput Estate Holders, who supported the revolutionists or participated with them were compromised. The British impounded many of their lands and properties and they were taxed with heavy fines. Raja Hanumant Singh, the Chief of Kalakankar was one such Taluqdar, who was dispossessed of his many properties for supporting Revolt of 1857. Raja Hanumant Singh, realized a pan India organization was necessary to put the voice and injustice faced by their community. He founded the association with other Taluqdars of Oudh and organization named the Ram Dal in the year 1857.  It was renamed Kshatriya Hitkarni Sabha in 1860. 
The association was thus formed to protect and fight for rights and interest of Rajput communities. Kshatriya Mahasabha is successor to the Kshatriya Hitkarni Sabha, which was renamed  Kshatriya Mahasabha 1897 under the leadership of Raja Balwant Singh of Awagarh with Thakur Umarao Singh of Kotla, Raja Rampal Singh of Kalakankar and Raja Uday Pratap Singh of Bhinga. Akhil Bhartiya Kshatriya Mahasabha came into existence on 19 Oct 1897, creating a platform to promote the cause of the Kashatriyas and Rajputs

A news letter called ' Rajput Monthly' was launched in 1898. The association had its first conference in the Rajput Boarding House at Agra. Maharaja Sir Pratap Singh of Jammu & Kashmir sponsored the launching of an Urdu publication called the Rajput Gazette as a fortnightly form Lahore.

At that time the princely states rulers and large zamindars held the sway and they started various schools and colleges in their territories for education and giving preference to students of Kshatriya community.

However, after independence, the situation changed dramatically for the upper Kshatriya caste and its influential members. The princely states were merged into the Union of India and later Zamindari was also abolished and association was directionless, immediately after independence of India in 1947. However, under president ship of Babu Ram Narayan a prominent Rajput politician from Bihar, meeting was held at Ujjain in the year 1955 and association was revived.

Centenary

The centenary celebration of the association was held in 1987 at New Delhi under president-ship of Raja Digvijaysinhji Prajapsinhji Jhala.

Activities

Re-conversion of Muslim Rajputs
In year 1922 under chairmanship of Raja Nahar Singh the organization took pioneering decision to bring back 4 lakh converted Muslim Rajputs back into Hindu fold by way of purification ritual. The historic meeting, where the decision was taken, was held at Agra on 31 December 1922. Later on, under guidance of Madan Mohan Malviya thousands were brought back in to the Hindu fold after purification. Inspired by this pioneering effort of the Kshatriya Mahasabha, a few months later at Akhil Bharatiya Hindu Mahasabha, which was founded by Madan Mohan Mavaiya himself, in its 1923 annual meet at Kashi also passed similar resolution to bring back converted Muslims in to Hindu fold by purification rites

Role in Resolution of Jagirdari Act

During the years 1952-1954, the institution played a pivotal role in respect to Jagirdari Case. The writs were filed in Supreme Court of India with respect to Resumption of Jagirdari Act. The Supreme Court of India accepted the role of Mahasabha, as a central co-ordinator in this case. The Prime Minister of India, Jawaharlal Nehru advised Govind Vallabh Pant, the earstwhile Chief Minister of Uttar Paradesh to negotiate with Akhil Bharatiya Kshatriya Mahasabha to end the stalemate.

Demanding Reservation on Economic Basis
As back as in year 1980 the association demanded that reservation should be given on economic basis rather than on caste basis.  Again in the year 2001, a memorandum containing lacs of signatures was submitted to Hon'ble President of India through District Collectors, demanding reservation on economic basis rather than on caste basis. A nationwide rath yatra from Jammu to Kanyakumari demanding reservation on economic basis rather than on caste basis was flagged off in October 2010, which ended in March 2011.

Successful agitation for declaration of birthday of Maharana Pratap as public holiday
In the year 2013 Akhil Bharatiya Kshatriya Mahasabha started an agitation and demanded with Chief Minister of Uttar Pradesh, Akhilesh Yadav to announce a public holiday on 9 May, as it is the birth anniversary of legendary warrior Maharana Pratap,  similar in line with  Rajasthan and Madhya Pradesh, where 9 May is a public holiday. After continuous efforts of two years, finally in 2015 Uttar Pradesh government, declared Maharana Pratap Jayanti a public holiday on May 9 every year.

Raising Issues of Atrocities on Rajputs
The association is today active in raising the issues related to Thakur and Rajput community, for example in 2004 is launched a major campaign for released of various Thakur caste members jailed by Mayavati government. The organization has strong presence in Bihar

The organization is known for taking up the rights, issues and cases related to Rajput and Kshatriya members of its own or together with other Kshatriya organizations in India like Karni Sena, Hadoti Mahasabha.

Publication of Books
The organization also helps publish well researched books on Rajput history and kings like Prithiviraj Chauhan, Maharana Pratap and other articles.

The Kshtra Dharma magazine published by them has been edited by historians like Raghuvir Sinh and saints like  Krishnananda Saraswati

Past Presidents
There are several notable persons since its inception, have headed the organization.
Raja Balwant Singh of Awagadh - 1897
Maharaja Sahab Rampal Singh of Kalakankar- 1899
Maharaja Sir Partap Singh of Jammu & Kashmir -1902 & 1913
Lt. Col. Partap Singh of Idar -  1903
General Maharaja Sir Ganga Singh of Bikaner - 1904
Raja Kaushal Kishor Singh of Manjholi - 1906
Raja Pratap Bahadur Singh of Partapgarh -1907
Maharaja Sir Jaswant Singh of Sailana - 1911
Maharaja Dhalip Singh of Sailana - 1920
Maharajadhiraj Sir Nahar Singhji of Shahapura -1922
Rao Sahab Gopal Singh Kharwa of Ajmer - 1924
Maharaja Sawaj Jai Singhji of Alwar - 1925
Maharaja Sahab Sajjan Singh of Ratlam - 1929
Maharaja Dhalip Singh of Sailana - 1930
Maharaja Ram Singh of Orchha - 1933
Kunwar Saheb Sir Vijay Partap Singh of Bagla, 1940
Maharaja Ram Ranvijay Partap Singh Bahadur of Dumraon - 1941
Maharaja Kumar Vijay Anand of Motihari - 1942
Raja Kamakhya Narayan Singh of Ramgarh - 1942 & 1953.
Maharaja Yadvendra Singh Judeo of Panna - 1946
Maharaja Sawai Tej Singh of Alwar - 1947
Thakur Sahab Col. Maan Singhji Bhati of Jodhpur - 1948
Babu Ram Narayan Singh of Hazaribagh - 1955
Maharawal Lakshman Singh of Dungarpur - 1960
Raja Shripal Singh of Singramau, Jaunpur - 1986
Raja Dr. Digvijay Singhji of Wankaner - 1997
 Sh. Mahender Singh Tanwar - 2019

References

Hindu organisations based in India
1897 establishments in India
Indian caste movements